Woodruff T. Sullivan III ("Woody" Sullivan) (born 1944) is a U.S. physicist and astronomer, known primarily for his work in astrobiology, galactic astronomy and extragalactic astronomy, history of astronomy, gnomonics, and the search for extraterrestrial intelligence (SETI).

Sullivan was born in Colorado, USA. He went on to study physics at the Massachusetts Institute of Technology, where he received a B.S. in 1966, and in 1971 a Ph.D. (astronomy) from the University of Maryland (supervisor: Frank Kerr).

In 2012, Sullivan received the LeRoy E. Doggett Prize from the American Astronomical Society's Historical Astronomy Division for his career contributions to the field of the history of astronomy, in particular his work on the history of early radio astronomy, culminating in his book Cosmic Noise: A History of Early Radio Astronomy (2009).

He was elected a Legacy Fellow of the American Astronomical Society in 2020.

Earth radio leakage research
In order to sample the radio signature of Earth from an external site and thus test whether TV broadcasting is in fact the principal component, Sullivan and S. H. Knowles used the Moon as a passive reflector of Earth's radio frequency leakage. Using the 305-m Arecibo radio telescope, a wide range of frequencies were scanned between 100 and 400 MHz. After local interference was eliminated (using an on-Moon, off-Moon technique), the frequencies of most observed signals could be identified with the television AM video carriers of various nationalities. This experiment demonstrated that the lunar surface is capable of reflecting terrestrial band III (175-230 MHz) television signals

References

External links
 Eavesdropping Mode and Radio Leakage from Earth
 Woodruff T. Sullivan, III, Curriculum Vitae. Archived from the original.

1944 births
Living people
MIT Department of Physics alumni
University System of Maryland alumni
American astronomers
21st-century American physicists
Astrobiologists
Fellows of the American Astronomical Society